An eruption most commonly relates to volcanoes, see types of volcanic eruptions.

Eruption may also refer to:

Geology
 Limnic eruption, of dissolved carbon dioxide from a body of water
 hydrothermal explosion, of underground water, especially
 Geyser eruption

Astronomy
 Solar eruption or flare
 Nova of a star, such as
 Eta Carinae's "Great Eruption" (1837–55) and "Lesser Eruption" (1887–95)

Medicine
 Tooth eruption, the emergence of teeth through the gum
 List of skin conditions, various of which are called "eruptions"

Film and television
 Eruption (film), a 2010 New Zealand television film
 Eruption, screen name of Eric Tai (born 1984), Tongan-Filipino actor, model, host and rugby union player

Music
Eruption (band), a 1970s/1980s British disco/R&B band
Eruption (German band), a short-lived German experimental band
Eruption (album), by Kluster
"Eruption" (instrumental), from Van Halen's first album
"Eruption", by Emerson, Lake & Palmer from the suite "Tarkus"
"Eruption", a 23-minute piece by Focus from the album Focus II or Moving Waves

Radio
Eruption Radio, a London-based radio station

See also
 Diet Coke and Mentos eruption, or soda geyser
 "Sexual Eruption", 2007 song by Snoop Dogg